Taeniolethrinops laticeps is a species of cichlid endemic to Lake Malawi where it occurs over sandy substrates.  This species can reach a length of  TL. it was discovered by Ethelwynn Trewavas.

References

laticeps
Taxa named by Ethelwynn Trewavas
Fish described in 1931
Taxonomy articles created by Polbot